Calculating the area of a triangle is an elementary problem encountered often in many different situations. The best known and simplest formula is  where b is the length of the base of the triangle, and h is the height or altitude of the triangle. The term "base" denotes any side, and "height" denotes the length of a perpendicular from the vertex opposite the base onto the line containing the base. In 499 CE Aryabhata, used this illustrated method in the Aryabhatiya (section 2.6).

Although simple, this formula is only useful if the height can be readily found, which is not always the case. For example, the land surveyor of a triangular field might find it relatively easy to measure the length of each side, but relatively difficult to construct a 'height'. Various methods may be used in practice, depending on what is known about the triangle. Other frequently used formulae for the area of a triangle use trigonometry, side lengths (Heron's formula), vectors, coordinates, line integrals, Pick's theorem, or other properties.

Using trigonometry

The height of a triangle can be found through the application of trigonometry.

 Knowing SAS (side-angle-side)
Substituting this in the formula   derived above, the area of the triangle can be expressed as:

(where α is the interior angle at A, β is the interior angle at B,  is the interior angle at C and c is the line AB).

Furthermore, since sin α = sin (π − α) = sin (β + ), and similarly for the other two angles:

 Knowing AAS (angle-angle-side)

and analogously if the known side is a or c.

 Knowing ASA (angle-side-angle)

and analogously if the known side is b or c.

Using side lengths (Heron's formula) 

The shape of the triangle is determined by the lengths of the sides. Therefore, the area can also be derived from the lengths of the sides. By Heron's formula:

where  is the semiperimeter, or half of the triangle's perimeter.

Three other equivalent ways of writing Heron's formula are

Formulas resembling Heron's formula
Three formulas have the same structure as Heron's formula but are expressed in terms of different variables. First, denoting the medians from sides a, b, and c respectively as ma, mb, and mc and their semi-sum  as σ, we have

Next, denoting the altitudes from sides a, b, and c respectively as ha, hb, and hc, and denoting the semi-sum of the reciprocals of the altitudes as  we have

where D is the diameter of the circumcircle:

Using vectors
The area of triangle ABC is half of the area of a parallelogram:

The area of a parallelogram embedded in a three-dimensional Euclidean space can be calculated using vectors. Let vectors AB and AC point respectively from A to B and from A to C. The area of parallelogram ABDC is then

which is the magnitude of the cross product of vectors AB and AC. 

The area of triangle ABC can also be expressed in terms of dot products as follows:

In two-dimensional Euclidean space, expressing vector AB as a free vector in Cartesian space equal to (x1,y1) and AC as (x2,y2), this can be rewritten as:

Using coordinates

For three general vertices, the equation is:

which can be written as

If the points are labeled sequentially in the counterclockwise direction, the above determinant expressions are positive and the absolute value signs can be omitted. The above formula is known as the shoelace formula or the surveyor's formula.

is equivalent to the shoelace formula.

In three dimensions, the area of a general triangle ,  and ) is the Pythagorean sum of the areas of the respective projections on the three principal planes (i.e. x = 0, y = 0 and z = 0):

Using line integrals
The area within any closed curve, such as a triangle, is given by the line integral around the curve of the algebraic or signed distance of a point on the curve from an arbitrary oriented straight line L. Points to the right of L as oriented are taken to be at negative distance from L, while the weight for the integral is taken to be the component of arc length parallel to L rather than arc length itself.

This method is well suited to computation of the area of an arbitrary polygon. Taking L to be the x-axis, the line integral between consecutive vertices (xi,yi) and (xi+1,yi+1) is given by the base times the mean height, namely . The sign of the area is an overall indicator of the direction of traversal, with negative area indicating counterclockwise traversal. The area of a triangle then falls out as the case of a polygon with three sides.

While the line integral method has in common with other coordinate-based methods the arbitrary choice of a coordinate system, unlike the others it makes no arbitrary choice of vertex of the triangle as origin or of side as base. Furthermore, the choice of coordinate system defined by L commits to only two degrees of freedom rather than the usual three, since the weight is a local distance (e.g.  in the above) whence the method does not require choosing an axis normal to L.

This is valid for all values of θ, with some decrease in numerical accuracy when |θ| is many orders of magnitude greater than π. With this formulation negative area indicates clockwise traversal, which should be kept in mind when mixing polar and cartesian coordinates. Just as the choice of y-axis is immaterial for line integration in cartesian coordinates, so is the choice of zero heading immaterial here.

Using Pick's theorem
See Pick's theorem for a technique for finding the area of any arbitrary lattice polygon (one drawn on a grid with vertically and horizontally adjacent lattice points at equal distances, and with vertices on lattice points).

The theorem states:

where  is the number of internal lattice points and B is the number of lattice points lying on the border of the polygon.

Other area formulas

Numerous other area formulas exist, such as

where r is the inradius, and s is the semiperimeter (in fact, this formula holds for all tangential polygons), and

where  are the radii of the excircles tangent to sides a, b, c respectively.

We also have

and

for circumdiameter D; and

for angle α ≠ 90°.

The area can also be expressed as

In 1885, Baker gave a collection of over a hundred distinct area formulas for the triangle. These include:

for circumradius (radius of the circumcircle) R, and

Upper bound on the area
The area T of any triangle with perimeter p satisfies

with equality holding if and only if the triangle is equilateral.

Other upper bounds on the area T are given by

and

both again holding if and only if the triangle is equilateral.

Bisecting the area
There are infinitely many lines that bisect the area of a triangle. Three of them are the medians, which are the only area bisectors that go through the centroid. Three other area bisectors are parallel to the triangle's sides.

Any line through a triangle that splits both the triangle's area and its perimeter in half goes through the triangle's incenter. There can be one, two, or three of these for any given triangle.

See also
Area of a circle
Congruence (geometry)#Congruence of trianglesCongruence of triangles

References

Area
Triangles